Kusum Lata Sawhney is a British-Indian authoress. She was born in the United Kingdom and she moved to India in 1989. She is the authoress of the novel Kindred Spirits, published in 1995. The book is an account of women's sexuality, the changing Indian social scene, and the undercurrents that continue in a whirlpool of their own. Kusum has written a collection of poems and worked as a journalist for India Today.

External links
Meet the Authoress - Kusum Sawhney, published in The Tribune (Chandigarh).

Living people
British writers
Indian women novelists
Year of birth missing (living people)
Indian women short story writers